Laura Jane Richardson (born December 11, 1963) is a four-star general in the United States Army who is the commander of United States Southern Command since October 29, 2021. Prior to that, she was the commanding general of United States Army North from July 2019 to September 2021. 

As an army aviator, Richardson flew Sikorsky UH-60 Black Hawk helicopters. Promoted to brigadier general in 2011, she served in various commands at Fort Hood and as chief of staff for communication in the International Security Assistance Force in Afghanistan. In June 2017, she was promoted to lieutenant general and appointed deputy commanding general of United States Army Forces Command (FORSCOM). She served as acting commander of FORSCOM from October 2018 until March 2019 and, on July 8, 2019, became the first woman appointed to command United States Army North. Richardson was nominated as commander of United States Southern Command by President Joe Biden in March 2021 and confirmed in this role by the United States Senate on August 11. Having been promoted on October 18, 2021, Richardson became the second woman to attain the rank of general in the U.S. Army, as well as the third woman to lead a combatant command.

Early life
The daughter of Suzanne (Allen) Strickland, a teacher and Darwin Jan Strickland, a physician, Richardson grew up in Northglenn, Colorado, where she attended public schools and graduated from Northglenn High School in 1982. She attended Metropolitan State College in Denver, where she earned a Bachelor of Science degree in psychology. She was an All American swimmer and earned her pilot's license at the age of 16. Richardson was commissioned via the Army Reserve Officers' Training Corps program in 1986.

Junior and field officer career
Richardson was commissioned into the United States Army Aviation Branch in 1986 as a second lieutenant. Richardson flew Sikorsky UH-60 Black Hawk helicopters in the 128th Aviation Company (Assault Helicopter). She was promoted to first lieutenant in 1988 and subsequently was administrative officer, executive officer, and platoon leader with 1st Battalion, 501st Aviation Regiment. She transferred to the 17th Aviation Brigade as an assistant logistics officer in 1989 and served in South Korea before returning to the 501st Aviation Regiment as a personnel officer in the 4th Battalion in 1990. Richardson commanded Headquarters and Headquarters Company, 4th Battalion from September 1990 to September 1991, and was promoted to captain in March 1991.

Richardson attended the Aviation Officer Advanced Course at Fort Rucker in 1991–1992 and took command of Company B, 1st Battalion, 158th Aviation Regiment in July 1992. She later served as the battalion's personnel officer (S-1). In 1995–96 she was a trainer in the Battle Command Training Program at Fort Leavenworth before spending a year as a student at the Army Command and General Staff College. Promoted to major in March 1997, Richardson became operations officer and then executive officer of 9th Battalion, 101st Aviation Regiment.

Richardson served as a military aide to Vice President Al Gore between February 1999 and January 2001. That year she was promoted to lieutenant colonel and became deputy operations officer of the 101st Airborne Division (Air Assault). From July 2002 to May 2004 Richardson was commander of 5th Battalion, 101st Aviation Regiment and served with that unit on Operation Iraqi Freedom. During that time, she was featured on the cover of the March 24, 2003 edition of Time magazine. She, her husband, and their daughter were the subjects of a story by Nancy Gibbs entitled "An American Family Goes to War", in which they were described as "...the first husband and wife battalion commanders in the new married-with-children military". She was Army campaign planner with the deputy chief of staff for operations and plans from 2004 to 2006. She was awarded a Master of Science degree from the Industrial College of the Armed Forces (now the Dwight D. Eisenhower School for National Security and Resource Strategy) at Fort McNair in June 2007. Promoted to colonel, she was commander of the Army garrison at Fort Myer until October 2009 when she was chief of the United States Senate liaison division for the Secretary of the Army.

General officer

In July 2011, Richardson was promoted to brigadier general and appointed commanding general of the Operational Test Command at Fort Hood. She was subsequently appointed deputy commanding general – support for the 1st Cavalry Division at Fort Hood, a position she left in 2013 to become deputy chief of staff, communication for the International Security Assistance Force in Afghanistan. Richardson returned to the United States after a year and became chief legislative liaison to the Office of the Secretary of the Army as a major general.

In June 2017, Richardson was promoted to lieutenant general and appointed deputy commander of United States Army Forces Command (FORSCOM), replacing Lieutenant General Patrick J. Donahue II, who was retiring. She was appointed by FORSCOM commander General Robert B. Abrams who said the decision took "less than a second". This was despite never having worked with Richardson; Abrams said "I know her reputation. I’ve seen her work... She’s the exact right leader at the exact right time". Her appointment was confirmed by the U.S. Senate and she became the first woman to hold the position officially (Major General Jody J. Daniels had acted as deputy for the week prior to Richardson's appointment). FORSCOM is the largest command in the U.S. Army, representing 770,000 soldiers and civilians including 200,000 regular army soldiers stationed in the United States and the entire National Guard and Army Reserve. In October 2018, Abrams left FORSCOM for a new assignment, and Richardson was named acting commander, the first woman to head the organization. In announcing the appointment, Army Chief of Staff Mark Milley indicated that Richardson could expect to be the acting commander for several months, and was being considered for permanent assignment to the post. She continued to serve as acting commander until General Michael X. Garrett assumed command in March 2019.

Commander of U.S. Army North
In April, Richardson was nominated to be the first female commander of United States Army North. She assumed command of ARNORTH/5th Army on July 8, 2019.

During Richardson's tenure, ARNORTH supported the Operation Allies Welcome Afghan evacuee mission. ARNORTH also participated in the federal government's response to the COVID-19 pandemic, as well as natural disaster relief including wildland firefighting operations in Northern California.

Commander of U.S. Southern Command

On March 6, 2021, Defense Secretary Lloyd Austin announced that President Biden nominated Richardson to become commander of the United States Southern Command. Her nomination was sent to the Senate on March 5, 2021, with hearings held on August 3, 2021. Richardson was originally going to be recommended by then-Defense Secretary Mark Esper and Chairman of the Joint Chiefs of Staff Mark Milley, but they delayed until after the 2020 United States presidential election over concern that then-President Donald Trump might react negatively to the nomination of a woman to a top command.

At her nomination hearing, Richardson stated her commitment to strengthening SOUTHCOM's approach to security cooperation and ensuring the United States remained the partner of choice in the region, as well as ensuring SOUTHCOM played its part in supporting the "whole-of-government" effort to distribute COVID-19 vaccines to partner nations. She added that she would focus on expanding the command's security cooperation efforts and multilateral exercises, prioritize international military education and training exchanges, and continue to work with Congress and the Department of Defense to increase interoperability levels and global integration. She was confirmed by unanimous voice vote on August 11, 2021.

Richardson relinquished command of ARNORTH to John R. Evans Jr. on September 9, 2021. She received her fourth star as the third woman to lead a combatant command, with the promotion ceremony held on October 18, 2021. Her four-star rank was pinned by the Chief of Staff of the United States Army, General James C. McConville and her husband, Lieutenant General James M. Richardson.

The change of command ceremony took place on October 29, 2021, with her predecessor, Admiral Craig S. Faller, retiring after 38 years of distinguished service.

Richardson was present at the Aspen Institute on July 20, 2022, where she stated:

Personal life 
Richardson is married to retired Lieutenant General James M. Richardson, who was deputy commander for combat development at the Army Futures Command. They have one daughter.

Awards and decorations

As listed by U.S. Army datasheet:

References 

|-

Living people
Female generals of the United States Army
American Senior Army Aviators
Women military aviators
Recipients of the Defense Distinguished Service Medal
Recipients of the Distinguished Service Medal (US Army)
Recipients of the Defense Superior Service Medal
Recipients of the Legion of Merit
Women in the Iraq War
United States Army personnel of the War in Afghanistan (2001–2021)
United States Army personnel of the Iraq War
Dwight D. Eisenhower School for National Security and Resource Strategy alumni
People from Colorado
Metropolitan State University of Denver alumni
1963 births
21st-century American women